The 1908 Arkansas State Normal football team represented Arkansas State Normal School—now known as the University of Central Arkansas—in the 1908 college football season. In their first year fielding a football team, under head coach Oscar D. Longstreth in his first collegiate coaching position, Arkansas State Normal compiled a 3–3 record against a variety of local, high school, and college teams, and outscored their opponents by a total of 63 to 61.

Schedule

References

Arkansas State Normal
Central Arkansas Bears football seasons
Arkansas State Normal football